The mentum is an anatomical structure, a projecting feature that is near the mouth of a variety of animals:

In insects, the mentum is the distal part of the labium. The mentum bears the palps, glossae, paraglossae, and/or ligula.
On the human face, the mentum refers to the protruding part of the chin.
In certain sea snails, marine gastropod mollusks, the mentum is a thin projection of the soft parts of the animal, below the mouth. It is found in the family Pyramidellidae.

References

Insect anatomy
Human anatomy
Gastropod anatomy